VDH may refer to:

Pieter van den Hoogenband, multiple olympic gold medallist
Victor Davis Hanson, a military historian
Verband für das Deutsche Hundewesen, a dog breed registry organisation
Jean-Luc Van Den Heede, a French sailor
Dong Hoi Airport IATA code